Sumykhimprom basketball club is a Ukrainian professional basketball club that is based in Sumy and sponsored by Sumykhimprom. The club competes in the Ukrainian Basketball Super League. The club's home arenas are the Complex of Ukrainian Academy of Banking and the Basketball Center "Olymp". The team will competed in the EuroChallenge 2008-09.

Roster
 Osvaldas Macernis
 Jonas Elvikis
 Serhiy Kuzmenko
 Yevheniy Pidirvany
 Pierre-Marie Altidor-Cespedes
 Ivan Kaliaiev
 Oleksandr Lemeshevsky
 Dmytro Tymchenko
 Mykola Kotenko
 Oleh Hushchenko

External links
Eurobasket.com Team Profile

Defunct basketball teams in Ukraine
Sport in Sumy